Sang Dar Meydan-e Sofla (also Romanized as Sang Dar Meydān-e Soflá) is a village in Direh Rural District, in the Central District of Gilan-e Gharb County, Kermanshah Province, Iran. At the 2006 census, its population was 97, in 21 families.

References 

Populated places in Gilan-e Gharb County